Azygos (impar), from the Greek άζυξ, refers to an anatomical structure that is unpaired. This is relatively unusual, as most elements of anatomy reflect bilateral symmetry. Azygos may refer to:

 Azygos anterior cerebral artery
 Azygos artery of vagina
 Azygos lobe
 Azygos vein
 Ganglion impar

Medical terminology